Chicoreus cnissodus, also known as the smelly murex, is a species of sea snail, a marine gastropod mollusk in the family Muricidae, the murex snails or rock snails.

Distribution
This marine species occurs off Sri Lanka.

References

 Houart R. (2015). Description of a new subspecies of Chicoreus (Triplex) cnissodus cnissodus (Euthyme, 1889) (Gastropoda, Muricidae) from Sri Lanka. The Festivus. 47(1): 29-35
 Liu, J.Y. [Ruiyu] (ed.). (2008). Checklist of marine biota of China seas. China Science Press. 1267 pp.

Muricidae
Gastropods described in 1889